Santa Teresa Gallura (Gallurese: Lungoni) is a town on the northern tip of Sardinia, on the Strait of Bonifacio, in the province of Sassari, Italy. The southern coast of Corsica can be seen from the beach.  The city is one of several possible locations for the ancient city of Tibula.

It has a permanent population of about 5,000, increasing to 10,000 to 15,000 with summer tourism. The main town square has various tourist shops and restaurants; many of these close in the off-season. Immediately to the north of the town is Rena Bianca, Santa Teresa's beach.

References

External links 

 the province of Sassari  Official website 
 Webzine about Sardinia
 Tourist information for Sardinia
 information for Sardinia

Cities and towns in Sardinia
1821 establishments in Italy
States and territories established in 1821
Populated places established in 1808